Manchuela or La Manchuela ("lesser La Mancha") is a comarca located in Castile-La Mancha and Valencian Community, Spain.

Historical comarca
The historical Manchuela comarca included the municipalities of Tarazona de la Mancha and Villalgordo del Júcar, and the Requena-Utiel comarca which had been part of the Cuenca Province until 1851 and is now part of the province of Valencia, Valencian Community, except for Mira.

This comarca has been traditionally a place of wheat, olive and wine growers, along with some cattle rearing. There are two wine Designations of Origin in the comarca, Manchuela DO and Ribera del Júcar DO.

Present-day comarca

The present-day Manchuela comarca is divided between Manchuela Albaceteña in Albacete Province, the Manchuela Conquense in Cuenca Province and the Valencian Manchuela (Requena-Utiel) in the Valencia Province. The Júcar River cuts across the high plateau of La Meseta forming deep gorges (Hoces del Júcar) offering spectacular landscapes. The Serranía de Cuenca forms the northern boundary of the comarca, and the Sierra de las Cabrillas the eastern. The western boundary is formed by a section of the Júcar River and the southern Almansa corridor.

Municipal terms and villages

Albacete province
Abengibre, Alatoz, Alborea, Alcalá del Júcar, Balsa de Ves, Carcelén, Casas-Ibáñez, Casas de Juan Núñez, Casas de Ves, Cenizate, Fuentealbilla, Golosalvo, Jorquera, Madrigueras, Mahora, Motilleja, Navas de Jorquera, Pozo-Lorente, La Recueja, Valdeganga, Villamalea, Villatoya, Villavaliente and Villa de Ves.

Cuenca province
Alarcón, Almodóvar del Pinar, Buenache de Alarcón, Campillo de Altobuey, Casasimarro, Casas de Benítez, Casas de Guijarro, Castillejo de Iniesta, El Herrumblar, Enguídanos, Gabaldón, Graja de Iniesta, Hontecillas, Iniesta, Ledaña, Minglanilla, Motilla del Palancar, Olmedilla de Alarcón, Paracuellos, El Peral, La Pesquera, El Picazo, Pozoamargo, Pozorrubielos de la Mancha, Puebla del Salvador, Quintanar del Rey, Sisante, Tébar, Valhermoso de la Fuente, Valverdejo, Villagarcía del Llano, Villalpardo, Villanueva de la Jara and Villarta.

Valencia province 
Camporrobles, Villalgordo, Fuenterrobles, Venta del Moro, Caudete de las Fuentes, Utiel, San Antonio, Requena, Sinarcas, and Chera.

See also
Manchuela DO

References

External links 

 Manchuelan Games (Juegos Manchuegos).
La Manchuela.com website
La Manchuela.net website
Touristic routes in la Manchuela
La Comarca de la Manchuela, la Mesopotamia Manchega
 Web INE (superficies y población de municipios)
 "El Bienhablao". Repertorio de vocablos (La Manchuela)

Province of Albacete
Province of Cuenca
Comarcas of Castilla–La Mancha